Gökçeağıl is a village in Dikili district of İzmir Province, Turkey.  It is situated to the east of Turkish highway . The population of the village is 279  as of 2011.

References

Villages in Dikili District